Fishermans Pocket is a locality in the Gympie Region, Queensland, Australia.

Geography
The Mary River forms most of the south-western boundary.

References 

Gympie Region
Localities in Queensland